Cyclone Hollow is a valley in Washington County in the U.S. state of Missouri.

Cyclone Hollow received its name from a cyclone (tornado) which struck the area.

References

Valleys of Washington County, Missouri
Valleys of Missouri